Servas International ("we serve (peace)"  in Esperanto) is a non-profit organization proving a hospitality exchange service.   

Servas is a nonprofit member organization that builds peace and cross-cultural understanding through day visits or overnight home stays among members who share information about themselves, to help ensure accountability. 
It was founded in 1949, in the aftermath of World War II, by Bob Luitweiler and other Danish students as an international network for people to meet and where suitable, to be offered a short stay, as part of the peace movement.  

The organisation may now be described as a platform, part of a gift economy. Members can be both hosts and travellers, and hosts do not charge for lodging.  

Members pay an annual fee to the organization, which is determined locally by country.  There is an international executive and each country has an elected board or committee to manage membership (including interviews for new applicants), determine membership fees, organise social events, support various peace-related activities. .

Servas is owned by an accredited Non-governmental organization and has been affiliated with the United Nations since 1973.

History
When it is started in 1949 hosts are printed by country and posted by each country to other member countries. Each member country has different organization and organ. Servas International formed as federation. 

Incorporation of Servas International
General Assembly In 1972 the importance, of establishing a legal international entity was discussed. It was agreed that it was necessary to have a legal framework for financial, administrative
international requirements. Dr. Max Habicht, Jnternational Lawyer and International Servas Sponsor prepared the attached "Statutes of Servas International" (Corporation Charter). The Charter was adopted and signed by all National Secretaries in attendance at the Conference. Servas Branches unrepresented by Secretaries at the Conference are requested to join the legal corporate body of Servas International and will be notified how to do so by the International Coordinator.

2006 Servas International started Servas on line project replacing paper based system 

General Assembly in 2006 in Italy distant vote procedure created and Statues updated accordingly.

National Groups/Member Countries

Membership statistics
2023- 126 member countries 14,309 host, Updated 01 August 2020

Executive Committees

2022-2025

President: Radha B. Radhakrishna  

Vice-President: Carla Kristensen 

General Secretary: Jonny Sågänger  

Membership & Technology Secretary: Paul Nielsen 

Peace Secretary: Francisco Luna 

Treasurer: Suresh Jain 

SI Membership and Techhnology Secretary

SI Distant Vote Administrator (SI DVA)

SI Internal Audit Committee (SI IAC)

SI Development Committee (SI DC)

SI Youth and Families Committee (SI YFC)

2018-2022
President: Jonny Sågänger  

Vice-President: Carla Kristensen   

Treasurer: Radha B. Radhakrishna  

SI Membership & Technology Secretary (SI MTS) : Jim Leask    (replaced Andreas Becker in February/March 2020). Jim Leask shares the SI MTS responsibility with Paul Nielsen of Servas Australia.   

General Secretary: Kiat Yun Tan   

Peace Secretary: Paige LaCombe

2015-2018
SI President: Jonny Sågänger (Sweden)  

SI Vice President: Ann Greenhough (Britain)  

SI General Secretary: Penny Pattison 

SI Treasurer: LV Subramanian 

SI Peace Secretary: Danielle Serres 

SI Host List Coordinator: Pablo Colangelo 

Development Committee:

Audit committee

Servas International Archivist

Conflict Resolution Committee:

Nomination Committee:

SI Job Descriptions and Statutes Committee:

Distant Vote Administrator: Chris Patterson (New Zealand)

Youth Leadership Committee:

2012-2015
SI President: Jonny Sågänger (Sweden)  

SI Vice President: Ann Greenhough (Britain)  

SI General Secretary: Jaime Romero 

SI Treasurer: Miroslaw Wasilewski 

SI Peace Secretary: Danielle Serres 

SI Host List Coordinator: Arnoud Philippo

2009-2012
President: Gary Sealey, 

Vice President: Pramod Kumar,

General Secretary: Penny Pattison 

Treasurer: Miroslaw Wasilewski, 

Host List Coordinator: Pablo Colangelo, 

Peace Secretary: Kim Jong Soo, 

Finance Committee

Conflict Resolution Committee

Nominations Committee

Newsletter Editor

Archivist:

Youth Development Officer

Youth Coordinator:

Job Description/Statutes Committee

Distant Vote Administrator

2006-2009
President: Gary Sealey, 

Vice President: Mary Jane Mikuriya, 

General Secretary: Pramod Kumar,

Treasurer: Ömer Özkan, 

Host List Coordinator: Anna Flammini, 

Peace Secretary: Nanda,

2004-2006
President: Geoff Maltby, 

Vice President: Bibendra Pradhananga, 

General Secretary: Honora Clemens,

Treasurer: Ömer Özkan, 

Host List Coordinator: Claudio Pacchiega, 

Peace Secretary: Gary Sealey,

2001-2004
President: Roger Martin, 

Vice President: Bibendra Pradhananga, 

General Secretary: Frits Stuurman, 

Treasurer: Gyöngyver Kudor, 

Host List Coordinator: Laura Ragucci, 

Peace Secretary: Marco Kappenberger, West 

Treasurers (Audit) Committee:

Committees
Appeals Committee:

Development Fund Committee

Complaints Committee

Nominations Committee

Job Descriptions Committee

1998-2001
President: Chris Slader 

Treasurer: Gilbert Revault 

Vice President: Bertrand Bailleul 

General Secretary: Kevin Newham 

Peace Secretary: Daniele Passalacqua 

Assistant General Secretary and Host List Co-ordinator: 
Claudia Pinto 

Servas International Newsletter Editor: Sharon Beldon

1995-1998
President: Chris Slader 

Vice President: Jenny Durand 

General Secretary: Vibeke Matorp 

Treasurer: Hazel Barham 
 
Assistant General Secretary: Mariangela Brunello 

Peace Secretary: Daniele Passalacqua

1992-1995
President: Ray Scott 

Vice President:  Jorge Zoppolo 

International Secretary: Vibeke Matorp 

Assistant Secretary: Maringela Brunello 

Treasurer: Hazel Barham 

Peace secretary: Harivallabh Parikh

1989-1992
President: Bob Luitweiler 

Vice-President: Janos Kurucz 

Treasurer: Hazel Barham

International Co-ordinator: Antonie Fried 

Host Co-ordinator: Judy Ross

Peace Secretary: Felix Zurita

Asian Member: Harivallabh Parikh 

Latin American Member: Jorge Zoppolo 

African Member: E.K. Narter-Olaga

1986-1989
General Secretary: Antonie FRIED 

Asst. General Secretary: Yvonne  BROWN 

President: Don FAWCETT 

Vice-President:  Duncan MEIKLE  

Treasurer: Peter Brock 

Editor SI Nwesletter: Frede ASGAARD 

Area Coordinators

EUROPE: ULLA OFFER 

AFRICA: E.K. NARTER-OLAGA 

EAST ASIA: TAKASHI AOKI 

SOUTH ASIA: HARIVALLABH PARIKH 

SOUTH PACIFIC: TOM & ANNIE YOUNG  

CENTRAL-AMERICA& CARRIBBEAN: FELIX ZURITA ACHOA 

SOUTH AMERICA: JORGE ZOPPOLO 

CO-OPTED MEMBERS

Reva King  

Maria  Soresina 

BARBARA WHITEHEAD

1983-1985
President: Don Fawcett 

Vice President: Maria Soresina 

General Secretary: Kay Lazaruz 

Treasurer: Peter Brock 

Peace Secretary: Jo Graham 

Editor, Servas International News: Janine Hall  

Assistant General Secretary: Lino Bugeja

Regional Coordinators

Regional Coordinator, Africa:  Zeru Michael (Africa)

Regional Coordinator, SE Asia: Takashi Aoki 

Regional Coordinator, N America & Caribbean:  Rodrigue Aristide 

Regional Coordinator, Europe & Near East:  Antonie Fried  

Regional Coordinator, Southern Asia: Harivallabh Parikh 

Regional Coordinator, South Pacific:  Nan Smith 

Coordinator for South America: Jorge Zoppolo

1980-1982 
President: Graham Thomas

Vice President: Don Fawcett

General Secretary: Barbara Whitehead

Assistant General Secretary Denise Waech 

Peace Secretary: Reva King

Editor Servas International: News Rosalind Schama

Treasurer: Denise Waech

Regional Co-ordinators

Africa: Lydia Jones

Southern Asia: Harivallabh Parikh 

Southeast Asia: Kunio Tanaka

South Pasific: Nan Smith

South America: Jorgo Zoppolo 

North America&Carabian : Kay Lazarus 

Europe and Near East: Antonio Fried

1978-1980
President: Graham Thomas

Treasurer: Doris Bucher

S.I.N. Editor: Donald Fuwcett

Asst. Treasurer: Denise Waech

The following positions wore filled by ballot 
General Secretary: Barbara Whitehead 

Vice-President: Martha Simon

Asst. Gen. Sec.: Reva King

Peace Secretary: Konrad Lübbert

Regional Co-ordinators wore appointed us follows:
Africa: Lydia Jones

Europe: Antonic Fried

South America: Narcelo Lorenzo

South Pacific: John and Judy Ebner

Southoust Asia: Masuo Amano

Southern Asia: Harivallabh Parikh

1974-1976
President: Reva King

Vice President: Harivallabh Parikh

Treasurer: Denise Vollenweider

Asst. Treasurer: Doris Bilcher

Secretary: Birgitte Damnsgaard 

Asst. Secretary: Ronald Golding

Peace Secretary: Hans Werner Emrich

News letter Editor: Barbara Acquach

Assft Editor: to be selected by Barbara Acquach

1972-1974

President & International Coordinator: Kurt Schmid  

Vice President & Ass't Internatinal Coordinator: Reva King

Treasurer: Denise Vollenweider

Ass't Treasurer: Swiss Servas member to be appointed by Denise Vollenweider

Secretary: Birgitte Damsgaard

Vice Secretary  Maria Soresina

Peace Secretary:  Jim Ryding

Editor of International Newsletter: Maria Soresina

Regional Coordinators:

Europe: Denise Vollenweider

Africa: Titus Mugavana

North America: Reva King  

Latin America Laura Langagne

South Pacific Max Hartin

1970-1972

The. following persons were elected:

International Coordinator~ Kurt Schmid  

Asst. Intl.Coordinator~ Reva King  

Asst. IntI. Coordinator in Training: Barbara Trischuk  

Regional coordinators. The following persons will handle the development of SERVAS in these countries:

Harivallabh Parikh  --Afghanistan, Ceylon, Australia, Kenya, and Ethiopia

Benelux--Indonesia

Sweden--Finland and Iceland

Barbara Trischuk  - Tanzania and Fiji

Joseph Girard  -~Algeria, Morocco, and Tunisia

International Coordinator--Eastern Europe

1951
Founders of Servas were those dedicated people like Bob Luitweiler, Connie Thorpe, Esma Burrough and the others in the Birmingham, England Peace Builder's team, and, Esther Harlan in California.

Esma Burrough  the first European Servas secretary. Seeds Of Servas

General Assemblies 
1952  Hamburg First Peace  Builders  International Conference,  Out of which came  the name "Servas"

References

Hospitality exchange services
Ecotourism
Organizations established in 1949
Peace organizations